There are 21 prisons in Haryana state of India, spread over 18 of its districts.

The current Director General of Prisons in Haryana is Shatrujeet Kapur, IPS.

List of prisons

See also 
 Prisons in India

References

External links 
 http://ePrisons.nic.in/NPIP/Public/DashBoard.aspx
 http://ncrb.nic.in/StatPublications/PSI/Prison2015/PrisonStat2015.htm

 
India
Lists of buildings and structures in India
India government-related lists
India law-related lists